Aleksander Bielaczyc (23 March 1947 – 30 August 1978) was a Polish sailor. He competed in the Dragon event at the 1972 Summer Olympics.

References

External links
 

1947 births
1978 deaths
Polish male sailors (sport)
Olympic sailors of Poland
Sailors at the 1972 Summer Olympics – Dragon
Sportspeople from Gdańsk